FC Dordoi-Plaza is a Kyrgyzstani football club based in Bishkek, Kyrgyzstan that played in the top division in Kyrgyzstan, the Kyrgyzstan League.

Achievements 
Kyrgyzstan League:
8th place: 2009

Kyrgyzstan Cup:

External links 
Career stats by KLISF

Football clubs in Kyrgyzstan
Football clubs in Bishkek